Niechmirów  is a village in the administrative district of Gmina Burzenin, within Sieradz County, Łódź Voivodeship, in central Poland.

The village has a population of 361.

During the German occupation of Poland (World War II), the Germans operated a Nazi prison in Niechmirów that was subordinate to the prison in Sieradz. In 1941, the Germans expelled the entire Polish population of the village.

References

Villages in Sieradz County